Xylocaris oculata is a species of beetle in the family Cerambycidae, the only species in the genus Xylocaris.

References

Trachyderini
Monotypic beetle genera